The International Horror Guild Award (also known as the IHG Award) was an accolade recognizing excellence in the field of horror/dark fantasy, presented by the International Horror Guild (IHG) from 1995 to 2008.

The IHG Awards were determined by a jury of notable horror/dark fantasy critics and reviewers, which has included Edward Bryant, Ann VanderMeer, Stefan Dziemianowicz, William Sheehan, Fiona Webster and Hank Wagner. Nomination suggestions were accepted from the public. The annual awards were usually announced during a special presentation at a convention or other event, and IHG Award presentations have been held at the World Fantasy Convention, the World Horror Convention and Dragon*Con.

Originally in the form of a "winged dog gargoyle" figure on a base, in 2002 the IHG Award was redesigned as a black, tombstone-shaped and free-standing plaque. The Living Legend Award had the same design, but in clear acrylic.

Presentations

References

External links
 About the International Horror Guild Award
 IHG Award Description and Images
 IHG Award Recipients 1994-2006
 IHG Award Recipients 2007

Awards established in 1995
Horror fiction awards